Lark Lane is a street in Liverpool, England, noted for its cafés, bars, boutiques, music venues and bistros and has a bohemian reputation. Its proximity to student residences, open green space and the variety of bars and restaurants makes it a popular venue as an alternative to the city centre.

The street leads from the Victorian Sefton Park to Aigburth Road, and is situated between Sefton Park district and the Aigburth district. At the Sefton Park end, the street narrows at a pair of stone gateposts which mark the entrance to Aigburth Drive (the road around the park) and the park itself.

The street originally had a local police station, the elaborate building for which is now in use as a community centre. For a short time a nearby side road housed a motor museum.

The nearest train station to Lark Lane is St Michaels, west of Aigburth Road in the former St. Michael's Hamlet.

In 2007, footballer Daniel Agger bought two restaurants on Lark Lane: Que Pasa and 52 Lark Lane.

In 2008, a novel was published, Angels Chic by Arjuna Krishna-Das, set largely around Lark Lane and its counter-culture circa 1990.

The book, Powder, by Keva Samson, begins the characters' timelines for the story in Lark Lane and frequently refers to it throughout the story.

References

External links
 www.larklaneguide.com

Streets in Liverpool
Restaurant districts and streets in England